Virtual Learning Academy Charter School (VLACS) is a nonprofit virtual charter school in Exeter, New Hampshire, the only public online high school in the state. It offers full-time and part-time admissions. The school was founded in 2007 by Steve Kossakoski, who holds a doctorate in education administration from University of New Hampshire. VLACS is licensed by the New Hampshire Board of Education, making it free to students under 21 living in the state. Students living in other states, however, must pay to use it. In 2010 they had 13,432 students enrolled in High and Middle School courses.

Notable alumni 

 Taylor Wenczkowski, ice hockey player

References

External links 
 US News & World Report - VLACS Stats
 Online Options to Complete a High School Diploma Limited for Adults
 NH leads the nation in Competency-Based Education

Charter schools in New Hampshire
2007 establishments in New Hampshire
Educational institutions established in 2007